Michael "Mick"/"Mike" Scott ( – 1968) was an English professional rugby league footballer who played in the 1940s, 1950s and 1960s.

Background
Mick Scott was killed aged 37 in an accident on the docks in Hull, East Riding of Yorkshire, England.

Playing career

International honours
Mick Scott won caps for England while at Hull in 1951 against Wales, in 1952 against Other Nationalities, and in 1953 against Wales.

Championship final appearances
Mick Scott played, and was captain in Hull FC's 10–9 victory over Halifax in the Championship Final during the 1955–56 season at Maine Road, Manchester on Saturday 12 May 1956, played in the 14–15 defeat by Oldham in the 1956-57 Championship Final at Odsal Stadium on Saturday 18 May 1957, and played, and scored a try in the 20–3 victory over Workington Town in the Championship Final during the 1957-58 season at Odsal Stadium on Saturday 17 May 1958.

Challenge Cup Final appearances
Mick Scott  played left-, i.e. number 8, in Hull FC's 13–30 defeat by Wigan in the 1959 Challenge Cup Final during the 1958–59 season at Wembley Stadium, London on Saturday 9 May 1959, in front of a crowd of 79,811, and played left- in the 5–38 defeat by Wakefield Trinity in the 1960 Challenge Cup Final during the 1959–60 season at Wembley Stadium, London on Saturday 14 May 1960, in front of a crowd of 79,773.

County Cup Final appearances
Mick Scott played in Hull FC's 2–7 defeat by Bradford Northern in the 1953 Cup County Cup Final during the 1953–54 season at Headingley Rugby Stadium, Leeds on Saturday 31 October 1953, played on the 14–22 defeat by Halifax in the 1954 Yorkshire County Cup Final during the 1954–55 season at Headingley Rugby Stadium, Leeds on Saturday 23 October 1954, played, and was captain in the 10–10 draw with Halifax in the 1955 Yorkshire County Cup Final during the 1955–56 season at Headingley Rugby Stadium, Leeds on Saturday 22 October 1955, and played, and was captain in the 0–7 defeat by Halifax in the 1955 Yorkshire County Cup Final replay during the 1955–56 season at Odsal Stadium, Bradford on Wednesday 2 November 1955, and played in the 14–15 defeat by Featherstone Rovers in the 1959 Yorkshire County Cup Final during the 1959–60 season at Headingley Rugby Stadium, Leeds on Saturday 31 October 1959, in front of a crowd of 23,983.

European Club Champions Final appearances
Mick Scott played, was captain, and scored a drop goal in Hull FC's victory in the European Club Champions Final during the 1956–57 season.

References

External links
 (archived by web.archive.org) Stats → PastPlayers → S at hullfc.com
 (archived by web.archive.org) Profile at hullfc.com
Search for "Mick Scott" at britishnewspaperarchive.co.uk
Search for "Mike Scott" at britishnewspaperarchive.co.uk
Search for "Michael Scott" at britishnewspaperarchive.co.uk
The Dentists Diary

1968 deaths
England national rugby league team players
English rugby league players
Hull F.C. captains
Hull F.C. players
Place of birth missing
Rochdale Hornets players
Rugby league props
Rugby league second-rows
Year of birth missing